"Flower" is Atsuko Maeda's first solo single. It was released in four versions: three regular CD+DVD "act" editions and a limited CD-only theater edition. First pressings of the regular editions came with a photo book (unique for each edition), while the theater edition came with either a handshake event ticket or one of ten photos at random. The title track was used as an insert song in the film Moshi Koukou Yakyuu no Joshi Manager ga Drucker no "Management" wo Yondara, starring Maeda herself. The single was released on June 22, 2011.

Track listings
The single was released in four versions: three regular CD+DVD "act" editions and a limited CD-only theater edition.

ACT.1
CD
Flower
Kono Mune no Melody (この胸のメロディー)
Flower (off-vocal)
Kono Mune no Melody (off-vocal)

DVD
Flower music video
Flower music video <dialog ver.>
Maeda Atsuko Special Interview (前田敦子スペシャルインタビュー『今、考えていること』)
Making the music video "Flower"

ACT.2
CD
Flower
Yoake Made (夜明けまで)
Flower (off-vocal)
Yoake Made (off-vocal)

DVD
Flower music video
Flower music video <dialog ver.>
Until Flower Blooms ~Maeda Atsuko's Journey~ (Flowerが咲くまで ～前田敦子の軌跡～)

ACT.3
CD
Flower
La Brea Ave.
Flower (off-vocal)
La Brea Ave. (off-vocal)

DVD
Flower music video
Flower music video <dialog ver.>
Maeda Atsuko Fashion Book (前田敦子ファッションブック『今、着てみたいお洋服』)

Theater Edition
Flower
Kono Mune no Melody (この胸のメロディー)
Brunch wa Blueberry (Brunchはブルーベリー)
Mousou Denwa "Moshi, Maeda Atsuko ga Koibito Dattara..." 1 (妄想電話「もし、前田敦子が恋人だったら・・・」①)
Mousou Denwa "Moshi, Maeda Atsuko ga Koibito Dattara..." 2 (妄想電話「もし、前田敦子が恋人だったら・・・」②)
Mousou Denwa "Moshi, Maeda Atsuko ga Koibito Dattara..." 3 (妄想電話「もし、前田敦子が恋人だったら・・・」③)

First pressings of the regular editions came with a photo book (unique for each edition), while the theater edition came with either a handshake event ticket or one of ten photos at random.

TV performances
[2011.06.19] Music Japan (NHK General TV)
[2011.06.19] Shin Domoto Kyoudai (Fuji Television)
[2011.06.20] HEY! HEY! HEY! Music Champ (Fuji Television)
[2011.06.20] Coming Soon!! (Tokyo Broadcasting System)
[2011.06.24] Music Station (TV Asahi)
[2011.06.24] Happy Music (Nippon Television)
[2011.06.26] CDTV (Tokyo Broadcasting System)

Charts and sales

Charts

First Week Sales: 176,967
Total Reported Sales: 212,766

References

2011 debut singles
Songs with lyrics by Yasushi Akimoto
Oricon Weekly number-one singles
Billboard Japan Hot 100 number-one singles
Japanese film songs
Song articles with missing songwriters